Georgios Staboulis (born 28 February 1975) is a retired Greek football midfielder.

References

1975 births
Living people
Greek footballers
Ionikos F.C. players
Apollon Smyrnis F.C. players
Super League Greece players
Association football midfielders